Interwoven is a 2016 American drama film directed by V.W. Scheich and starring Mo'Nique, Myles Cranford, Jon Eiswerth and Brooke Burgstahler.

Cast
Mo'Nique as Barbara
Brooke Burgstahler as Jessie
Myles Cranford as Otis
Jon Eiswerth as Luke
Kenichi Iwabuchi as Takashi
Keenon Harris as Derek
Cecilia Yesuil Kim as June
Aviva Pressman as Young Joanne
Hilary Barraford as Jill
Jillean Tucker as Mandy
Carlotta Elektra Bosch as Helena
Georgia Van Cuylenburg as Grace

References

External links
 

American drama films
2016 drama films
2010s English-language films
2010s American films